John Gunning may refer to:
 John Gunning (surgeon), an English surgeon
 John W. Gunning, an American businessman, mechanic, and politician
 John Gunning (journalist), an Irish sports journalist